The 2014 Individual Long Track/Grasstrack World Championship was the 44th edition of the FIM speedway Individual Long Track World Championship.

The world title was won by Erik Riss of Germany.

Venues

Final Classification

References 

2014
Speedway competitions in France
Speedway competitions in Germany
Speedway competitions in the Netherlands
Long
2014 in Dutch motorsport
2014 in German motorsport
2014 in French motorsport